is a village located in Kunigami District, Okinawa Prefecture, Japan.

As of 2013 the village had a population of 5,544 and a population density of 180 persons per km2.

Etymology

The kanji for Ginoza (宜野座) mean "suitable field in which to sit".

Geography

Ginoza is located on the eastern coast of the middle of the island of Okinawa. The village is located on the backbone of mountains that run north to south on Okinawa Island, and slopes gently to a broad coastline along the Pacific Ocean. The Kanna Dam was completed in 1993.

Neighboring municipalities

Ginoza borders three municipalities in Okinawa Prefecture.

Nago
Kin
Onna

Districts

Ginoza is divided into six districts.

History

The area of present-day Ginoza was historically agricultural. The area was, however, used as a retreat for members of the Yukatchu artistocratic class of the Ryukyu Kingdom; consequently, the area was strongly influenced, economically and culturally, by the central Ryukyuan state. In a census of Ginoza in 1903, half the town was registered as nobility, and half as commoners.

Ginoza became part of Okinawa Prefecture with its creation in 1879, and part of Kunigami District in 1896. In the administrative reorganization of Okinawa Prefecture in 1908 the Kinmu magiri was divided into two villages; the majority of the former magiri became Ginoza, and a small part was added to the present-day town of Kin. A large part of the population of Ginoza emigrated overseas before World War II.

During World War 2 Ginoza village's schools were used as field hospitals. Bodies lie buried around the buildings to this day. Directly after the war Ginoza the south central part of Ginoza was home to a large concentration of refugees. The population of the village reached over 100,000, and the village was temporarily divided into six cities. The population of the village dropped rapidly after this period as Okinawans returned to their home villages. 50% of Ginoza remains occupied by United States military bases.

Culture

The Ginoza Village Museum opened in 1994.

Economy

Agricultural production remains high in Ginoza. Like other areas of Okinawa, the village produces sugarcane. Cut flowers production, which has spread rapidly to other municipalities in Okinawa Prefecture, has also been developed in Ginoza. The village produces of chrysanthemums and orchids. Tropical fruit, specifically pineapples and mangoes, is also a developing part of the agricultural sector Ginoza. Additionally potatoes are grown in Ginozan.

Rent from land used for military bases by the United States remains a large source of income in the Ginoza. The village government has attempted to diversify the economy of Ginoza, but dependence on rental income remains high.

Government

Under the Local Autonomy Law of 1947 the government of Ginoza consists of an elected village council, an elected mayor, and administrative committees and departments under control of the mayor. Ginoza, with a population of under 6,000 residents, has a village council consisting of 12 members. Members of the council and the mayor serve a four-year term. The mayor of Ginoza is Atsushi Tōma.

Education

Ginoza operates three elementary schools (Matsuda (松田小学校), Kanna (漢那小学校), and Ginoza (宜野座小学校) Elementary Schools) and one junior high school (Ginoza Junior High School (宜野座中学校)).

The Okinawa Prefectural Board of Education operates .

Transportation

Road

Ginoza is crossed by Japan National Route 329, national highway which connects Nago, Okinawa and Naha, Okinawa, and the Okinawa Expressway. The Ginoza Interchange connects JNR 329 and the Okinawan Expressway.

References

External links

 Ginoza official website 

Villages in Okinawa Prefecture
Populated coastal places in Japan